Talich Kuh (also Romanized as Talīch Kūh) is a village in Jennat Rudbar Rural District, in the Central District of Ramsar County, Mazandaran Province, Iran. At the 2006 census, its population was 8, in 4 families.

References 

Populated places in Ramsar County